The 2004–05 season was the 56th season of competitive football in Pakistan.

Overview
2004–05 was the first season to feature the re-branded and redesigned Pakistan Premier League. The National Football League was renamed the Pakistan Premier League, featuring league system replacing the old group stage and knockout system.
Naka Muhammaden suffered financial problems, withdrew from the league and came back to complete the remaining matches and folded at the ended at the end of season.
 Allied Bank folded their team at the end of season.

Teams

Dissolved
 Allied Bank folded their team at the end of the season, after refusing to renew contracts of some players.
 Naka Muhammaden folded at the end of the season owing to financial reasons.

Internationals

Friendlies

Club competitions

Pakistan Premier League

Football Federation League
<noinclude>

National Football Challenge Cup

References

 
2004 in association football
2005 in association football